Hugh Pugh may refer to:

Hugh Pugh (sailor) (1794/5–1865), legendary Welsh sailor
Hugh Pugh (fictional character), fictional character in the British TV comedy series Barry Welsh is Coming